Ceratolithus is an extinct genus from a well-known class of fossil marine arthropods, the trilobites. It lived during the later part of the Arenig stage of the Ordovician Period, approximately 478 to 471 million years ago.

Distribution 
Ceratolithus has been found in the Lower Ordovician of China (Arenig, Meitan Formation, Central Szechwan).

Taxonomy

Taxa that may be confused with Ceratolithus 
The haptophyte genus Ceratolithus.

References 

Asaphida genera
Ordovician trilobites of Asia
Fossils of China